Peter Sutton is the name of:

 Peter Sutton (anthropologist) (born 1946), Australian social anthropologist and linguist
 Peter Sutton (basketball), Australian Olympic basketball player
 Peter Sutton (sound engineer) (1943–2008), American sound engineer
 Peter Sutton (bishop) (1923–2013), Anglican bishop of Nelson
 Peter Alfred Sutton (1934–2015), Roman Catholic bishop
 Peter Sutton (priest) (born 1959), Archdeacon of the Isle of Wight
 Peter C. Sutton (born 1949), American art historian
 Pete W. Sutton (born 1970), British Writer